Camp Lewis may refer to:

 Joint Base Lewis–McChord
 Camp Lewis (Montana), a former U.S. Army camp in Montana
 Camp Lewis (New Jersey), part of the Northern New Jersey Council of the Boy Scouts of America
 Camp Lewis (Oregon), part of the Cascade Pacific Council of the Boy Scouts of America